Abraham Levy  (16 July 1939 – 25 December 2022) was an English Orthodox rabbi, theologian, and author. He served as spiritual head of the Spanish and Portuguese Jewish community in Britain from 1962 to 2012, and was a founding member of Naima Jewish Preparatory School. Levy was appointed an Officer of the Order of the British Empire (OBE) for services on inter-faith co-operation in the 2004 New Year Honours.

Biography
Abraham Levy was born on 16 July 1939 in Gibraltar. His uncle was Sir Joshua Hassan, former Chief Minister of Gibraltar. His siblings were the former Mayor of Gibraltar Solomon Levy, Nita Corre, Loli Berisch and James Levy. Rabbi Abraham Levy is also a relative to Fleur Hassan-Nahoum, deputy mayor of Jerusalem.

Levy moved to the United Kingdom in 1951 to study at Carmel College, and received his ordaination from Jews' College and a PhD from the University of London. He became spiritual head of the Britain Spanish and Portuguese Jewish community in 1962, a position he held until 2012. Levy served as rabbi of the Bevis Marks Synagogue and Lauderdale Road in London. He was also Honorary Deputy President of London School of Jewish Studies, founder and Honorary Principal of Naima Jewish Preparatory School, and an ecclesiastical authority for the Board of Deputies of British Jews.

Levy died in London on 25 December 2022, at the age of 83. He had one son. He is buried at Hoop Lane Sephardi Cemetery in Golders Green. King Charles paid tribute to him, describing him as a "kind and towering figure" and said he knew him "as a greatly respected and admired teacher across communities."

Awards and honours
 In 1993, Levy was awarded a Knight Commander (Encomienda) Order of Civil Merit (Spain).
 In 2004, Levy was appointed an Officer of the Order of the British Empire (OBE) for services to inter-faith co-operation.

Publications
 
 
  Illustrated.
 
  Levy's memoirs, filled with anecdotes from both public life and community service and a testimony to his religious faith.

References

1939 births
2022 deaths
20th-century English rabbis
20th-century Gibraltarian people
21st-century English rabbis
21st-century Gibraltarian people
21st-century memoirists
Alumni of King's College London
Alumni of the London School of Jewish Studies
British Jewish theologians
Collars of the Order of Civil Merit
English non-fiction writers
English Orthodox rabbis
English people of Jewish descent
English people of Spanish-Jewish descent
English Sephardi Jews
Gibraltarian Jews
Gibraltarian men
Gibraltarian memoirists
Modern Orthodox rabbis
Officers of the Order of the British Empire
Rabbis from London
Writers from London